Der Dativ ist dem Genitiv sein Tod is a series of books by Bastian Sick which deal in an entertaining manner with unappealing or clumsy use of the German language, as well as areas of contention in grammar, orthography, and punctuation.

Origins
The books are collections of the author’s column 'Zwiebelfisch', which appeared from 2003 to 2012 in Spiegel Online. Since February 2005 it also appeared in print in Der Spiegel'''s monthly culture supplement. The column's title, literally 'onion fish', is a printers' term for a single character with an incorrect font in a block of text.wissen.de-Wörterbuch: Zwiebelfisch The series consists of six volumes, all of which reached the top of the book sales lists, with the first volume selling more than 1.5 million copies within two years.

The title, Der Dativ ist dem Genitiv sein Tod is a way of saying Der Dativ ist der Tod des Genitivs  or Der Dativ ist des Genitivs Tod, a reference to a linguistic phenomenon in certain dialects of German where a noun in genitive case is replaced by a possessive adjective and noun in the dative case (see his genitive).

Reception
In several German states, articles from the books have been used officially as teaching materials, and—according to Sick's foreword of August 2005, the series has been added to the set text list for the Abitur in Saarland. The material in the book series has been adapted into a DVD, a board game, a computer game and into audiobooks.

On the other hand, the linguists Vilmos Ágel, Manfred Kaluza and André Meinunger think that Sick's books are not useful for teaching German because they contain factual errors, often just deal with irrelevant nitpicking, and don't give sufficient proof of why something Sick deems wrong should be wrong.Manfred Kaluza: „Der Laie ist dem Linguisten sein Feind“. Anmerkungen zur Auseinandersetzung um Bastian Sicks Sprachkolumnen – Informationen Deutsch als Fremdsprache, 35. Jg, Heft 4, 2008, S. 432–442

Book titles
 Der Dativ ist dem Genitiv sein Tod – Ein Wegweiser durch den Irrgarten der deutschen Sprache. Kiepenheuer und Witsch, Köln 2004, 
 Der Dativ ist dem Genitiv sein Tod, Folge 2 – Neues aus dem Irrgarten der deutschen Sprache. Kiepenheuer und Witsch, Köln 2005, 
 Der Dativ ist dem Genitiv sein Tod. Folge 3 – Noch mehr aus dem Irrgarten der deutschen Sprache. Kiepenheuer und Witsch, Köln November 2006, 
 Der Dativ ist dem Genitiv sein Tod. Folge 4 – Das Allerneueste aus dem Irrgarten der deutschen Sprache. Kiepenheuer und Witsch, Köln 2009, 
 Der Dativ ist dem Genitiv sein Tod. Folge 5. Kiepenheuer und Witsch, Köln 2013, 
 Der Dativ ist dem Genitiv sein Tod. Folge 6. Kiepenheuer und Witsch, Köln 2015, 

 DVD title 
 Der Dativ ist dem Genitiv sein Tod – Die Große Bastian Sick Schau. [sic] Sony BMG Music Entertainment GmbH, 2008, ASIN B000X1YDCC

 Game titles 
 Der Dativ ist dem Genitiv sein Tod. KOSMOS, 2006, ASIN 3440690237
 Der Dativ ist dem Genitiv sein Tod – Das PC-Spiel.'' (PC & Mac) United Soft Media Verlag GmbH, 2007, ASIN 3803228301

External links 
 Der Spiegel ‘Zwiebelfisch’ column (German)

German books
German grammar